Ulhas Patil is a Shiv Sena politician from Kolhapur district, Maharashtra. He is a member of the 13th Maharashtra Legislative Assembly. He represents the Shirol Assembly Constituency as member of Shiv Sena. He born in farmer family from childhood he knows the basic problems of farmer. that's why he decides fight for farmers problems. Ulhas patil started his work in early 1990s. he done much more protests for farmers in kolhapur district.

He first fill his candidature of vidhansabha from shirol assembly constituency from swabhimani shetkari sanghtna and then in 2014 from shivsena and first time he elected as member of legislative assembly.

Positions held
 2014: Elected to Maharashtra Legislative Assembly

See also
 Hatkanangle Lok Sabha constituency

References

External links
 Shiv Sena Official website
MLA Ulhas Patil official website
Ulhas Patil2009 candidature

Maharashtra MLAs 2014–2019
Living people
Shiv Sena politicians
People from Kolhapur district
Marathi politicians
1962 births